Kappa Alpha may refer to:
Kuklos Adelphon, known as "Old Kappa Alpha" or "Kappa Alpha", an American college Greek-letter fraternity, founded 1812 at the University of North Carolina.
Kappa Alpha Society, an American college Greek-letter fraternity, founded 1825 at Union College, Schenectady, New York.
Kappa Alpha Order, an American college Greek-letter fraternity, founded 1865 at Washington College, Lexington, Virginia.